Matthias Richards (February 26, 1758 – August 4, 1830) was a member of the United States House of Representatives from Pennsylvania.

Early life and education
Matthias Richards was born near Pottstown, Pennsylvania. He had many siblings, including  an older brother John Richards. His schooling was with a private tutoring, as was typical of many families then.

Revolutionary War
He enlisted and served during the American Revolutionary War as a private in Col. Daniel Udree's second battalion, Berks County Militia, from August 5, 1777, until January 5, 1778.  He was commissioned a major of the Fourth Battalion, Philadelphia County Militia in 1780.

Career
In 1788 Richards was appointed a justice of the peace and held this office for forty years.  He was appointed a judge of Berks County Courts (1791–1797) by Governor Shulze, a nephew.

After being elected to Congress, Richards was appointed an inspector of customs (1801–1802). He was appointed collector of revenue for the ninth district of Pennsylvania in 1813, and clerk of the orphans' court for Berks County in 1823.  He also worked at mercantile pursuits in Reading, Pennsylvania, until his death there on August 4, 1830.

Marriage and family
Having become an artisan and saddler, Richards married Maria Salome Muhlenberg ("Sally"), then age 15, on May 8, 1782.  She was the youngest child of Henry Melchior Muhlenberg. Among their children was John William Richards, who became a minister.  His son Matthias Henry Richards became a professor of English at Muhlenberg College in 1868. His grandson Henry Melchior Muhlenberg Richards was an American military officer who served in the Union Army during the American Civil War and then as a Captain in the United States Navy during the Spanish–American War. Henry Melchior Muhlenberg Richards also married a Van Leer whose family owned most of Reading, Pennsylvania at the time. This is where Richards was laid to rest and the city where he spent most of his life, and was interred at that city's Charles Evans Cemetery.

Congress
Richards was elected as a Democratic-Republican to the Tenth and Eleventh Congresses.  He did not stand for renomination in 1810.

References

1758 births
1830 deaths
Burials at Charles Evans Cemetery
Muhlenberg family
Pennsylvania state court judges
Pennsylvania militiamen in the American Revolution
Democratic-Republican Party members of the United States House of Representatives from Pennsylvania